Joseph G. Holland was a college football and baseball player as well as baseball coach. He coached at his alma mater Clemson College in 1910, leading the Clemson Tigers baseball team to a 10–11 record. Holland was an All-Southern fullback for the football team in 1904, selected such by former Clemson coach John Heisman, during a year in which he was a sophomore captain. He missed both extra points against Georgia. Holland also played 7 seasons of minor league baseball, including 69 games for the San Francisco Seals of the Pacific Coast League in 1911.

References

Clemson Tigers football players
Clemson Tigers baseball players
Clemson Tigers baseball coaches
American football fullbacks
All-Southern college football players
Roanoke Tigers players
Baseball third basemen